Matthew Peter Burke (born 15 September 1964) is an Australian former rugby union and rugby league footballer. He later served as a Waverley Council lifeguard on Bondi Beach.

Early life
Born in Gosford on the New South Wales coast, Burke attended Waverley College in Sydney's eastern suburbs, graduating in 1981.

Rugby career
Burke made his debut for the Australian national rugby union team on 3 November 1984. He played 23 tests for the Wallabies on the wing and scored 15 tries, including five in the 1987 Rugby World Cup. Between 1988 and 1992, he played rugby league for the Manly-Warringah Sea Eagles, Eastern Suburbs Roosters and Balmain Tigers in the New South Wales Rugby League premiership. After a promising start, Burke's professional career stalled and he was relegated to lower grade football with Easts and Balmain.

Post-rugby career
For some time after retirement, Burke ran the Mill Hill pub in Bondi Junction. He later spent two seasons as a Waverley Council lifeguard on Bondi Beach, appearing on the factual television programme Bondi Rescue. As of November 2009, he was a proprietor of the Primavera Espresso Bar in the Sydney CBD.

Personal life
Burke's father, Peter, was a rugby league international and played for Manly-Warringah. Burke has three brothers, Brad, Daniel and Patrick.

References

1964 births
Living people
Australia international rugby union players
Australian rugby league players
Australian rugby union players
Australian surf lifesavers
Balmain Tigers players
Manly Warringah Sea Eagles players
People from the Eastern Suburbs (Sydney)
Sydney Roosters players
Rugby league centres
Rugby league players from Gosford, New South Wales
Rugby union wings
Rugby union players from New South Wales